Albertson is a hamlet and census-designated place (CDP) in the Town of North Hempstead in Nassau County, on Long Island, in New York, United States. The population was 5,182 at the 2010 census.

History 
The first European settler was John Seren who came from Connecticut in 1644. Later Townsend Albertson started a farm and gristmill and the community became known as Albertson.

In 1850, a road was built through Albertson on the lands of Isaac Underhill Willets. The road is still known as I.U. Willets Road. (Willets complained that Long Island has more roads than it would ever need). The Long Island Rail Road opened an Albertson train station in 1864.

In 1908, the Vanderbilt Motor Parkway was built on the southern border of Albertson. In 1938, it was closed, and in 1940, it was replaced by the Northern State Parkway, which runs along the northern border of Albertson.

In 1946, suburbanization began with a small development by William Levitt. The last farms were developed in the mid-1960s.

The Searingtown School (now in Albertson) was one of the schools involved in the landmark Supreme Court case Engel v. Vitale (1962), which disallowed government-directed prayers in public schools.

Geography

Albertson is located south of Roslyn and east of Searingtown.

Demographics

As of the census of 2010, there were 5,182 people, 1,812 households, and 1,442 families residing in the CDP. The population density was 7,866.8 per square mile (3,042.0/km). There were 1,853 housing units at an average density of 2,803.3/sq mi (1,084.0/km). The racial makeup of the CDP was 70.4% White, 24.3% Asian, 0.3% African American, 0.02% Native American, 1.27% from other races, and 1.83% from two or more races. Hispanic or Latino of any race were 5.50% of the population.

There were 1,812 households, out of which 33.6% had children under the age of 18 living with them, 67.7% were married couples living together, 8.4% had a female householder with no husband present, and 20.4% were non-families. 17.9% of all households were made up of individuals, and 11.3% had someone living alone who was 65 years of age or older. The average household size was 2.87 and the average family size was 3.27.

In the CDP, the population was spread out, with 22.5% under the age of 18, 6.4% from 18 to 24, 27.1% from 25 to 44, 24.6% from 45 to 64, and 19.4% who were 65 years of age or older. The median age was 42 years. For every 100 females, there were 93.7 males. For every 100 females age 18 and over, there were 90.8 males.

The median income for a household in the CDP was $66,516, and the median income for a family was $77,516. Males had a median income of $55,000 versus $44,792 for females. The per capita income for the CDP was $31,222. About 4.5% of families and 4.7% of the population were below the poverty line, including 5.4% of those under age 18 and 5.5% of those age 65 or over.

Parks and recreation 
 John D. Caemmerer Park

Government

Town representation 
As Albertson is an unincorporated hamlet, it has no government of its own, and is instead governed directly by the Town of North Hempstead in Manhasset.

Albertson is located within the Town of North Hempstead's 2nd council district, which as of September 2022 is represented on the North Hempstead Town Council by Peter J. Zuckerman (D–East Hills).

Representation in higher government

County representation 
Albertson is primarily located within Nassau County's 9th Legislative district, which as of September 2022 is represented in the Nassau County Legislature by Richard Nicoello (R–New Hyde Park). However, the southeastern portion of the hamlet is located within Nassau County's 10th Legislative district, which as of September 2022 is represented in the Nassau County Legislature by Mazi Melesa Pilip (R–Great Neck).

New York State representation

New York State Assembly 
Albertson is split between the New York State Assembly's 16th and 19th Assembly districts, which as of September 2022 are represented by Gina Sillitti (D–Manorhaven) and Edward Ra (R–Garden City South), respectively.

New York State Senate 
Albertson is located in the New York State Senate's 7th State Senate district, which as of September 2022 is represented in the New York State Senate by Anna Kaplan (D–North Hills).

Federal representation

United States Congress 
Albertson is located in New York's 3rd congressional district, which as of September 2022 is represented in the United States Congress by Tom Suozzi (D–Glen Cove).

United States Senate 
Like the rest of New York, Albertson is represented in the United States Senate by Charles Schumer (D) and Kirsten Gillibrand (D).

Politics 
Politically, Albertson is almost evenly split. In the 2008 presidential election Democrat Barack Obama won 51% of the vote to Republican John McCain's 48%.

Education

School districts 

Albertson is located within the boundaries of (and is thus served by) the Herricks Union Free School District, the Mineola Union Free School District, and the East Williston Union Free School District. As such, children who reside within the hamlet and attend public schools will go to school in one of these three school districts depending on where they live within the hamlet.

Library districts 
Albertson is located within the boundaries of (and is thus served by) Roslyn's library district (the Bryant Library) and the Shelter Rock Library District. The area of the hamlet located served by the Roslyn Union Free School District is served by the Bryant Library, and the areas of the hamlet served by the Herricks and Mineola Union Free School Districts are served by the Shelter Rock Public Library.

Infrastructure

Transportation

Road 
The Northern State Parkway forms the hamlet's northern border with Roslyn Heights. Other major roads which pass through the hamlet include I.U. Willets Road and Willis Avenue.

Additionally, the Long Island Motor Parkway used to run through the hamlet.

Rail 

Albertson is served by the Albertson station on the Long Island Rail Road's Oyster Bay Branch.

Bus 
Roslyn Estates is served by the n23 bus route, which is operated by Nassau Inter-County Express (NICE). This bus route travels along Willis Avenue through the hamlet, following the route of the former New York & North Shore Traction Company's trolley route between Mineola and Roslyn, which ran through the area in the early 20th century.

Utilities

Natural gas 
National Grid USA provides natural gas to homes and businesses that are hooked up to natural gas lines in Albertson.

Power 
PSEG Long Island provides power to all homes and businesses within Albertson.

Sewage 
Albertson in its entirety is connected to the Nassau County Sewage District's sanitary sewer network.

Water 
Albertson is primarily located within the boundaries of the Albertson Water District. However, smaller portions are served by the Garden City Park Water District, the Roslyn Water District, and the Village of Williston Park's water system.

Notable person
Rick Pasqualone – American actor and voice actor.

References

External links

 Albertson Fire Company

Town of North Hempstead, New York
Census-designated places in New York (state)
Census-designated places in Nassau County, New York
Hamlets in Nassau County, New York
1644 establishments in the Thirteen Colonies
Populated places established in 1644
Connecticut Colony establishments on Long Island